Vitaliy Viktorovych Lytvynenko  (born 5 January 1985, Kyiv) is a Ukrainian politician, social activist and journalist. Among his spheres of interest are the revival of Orthodox Christianity, national revival of Ukraine and strengthening of its position in the world and relations with countries of the Near East. He also studies the Arabic language and Eastern philosophy. A member of the Sobor of the Kyiv Patriarchate of the Eastern Orthodox Church, Lytvynenko is an advisor to the head of the Ukrainian Club.

External links
 Nacija.info
 Litforum.org
 Glavcom.ua
 (Майно пустять на аукціон. Віталій Литвиненко, Хрещатик, 08.02.2007, №19(3009)
 (Т.Бурнос: СНГ - привычка или затянувшаяся стабильность? 05.12.2012)
 (Т.Бурнос: Беларусь и Украина в российском контексте)
 (Т.Бурнос: Беларусь и Украина в российском контексте)
 (Анна Лищук. Россия единолично хочет управлять украинской ГТС)
 (2010-10-05, Віталій Литвиненко, політолог Українського клубу: Кредит довіри – найбільший ресурс цих виборів, і хто його дасть, той і виграє)
 Віталій Литвиненко. Реалії Європейської хартії регіональних мов і мов національних меншин та сучасний стан української мови

1985 births
Politicians from Kyiv
Eastern Orthodox Christians from Ukraine
Living people